Drive on Moscow is an iOS strategy game by American company Shenandoah Studio and released November 21, 2013.

Critical reception
The game has a rating of 90 on Metacritic based on four critic reviews.

Gamezebo said "Drive on Moscow is a triumph, a game as sweeping as the campaign it seeks to simulate. Shenandoah continue to single-handedly redefine the strategy genre on iOS, and you should get on board: the entry price looks steep but it's worth every penny." 148apps wrote "Wargames have a notorious learning curve. Drive On Moscow tries to flatten that curve." 4Players.de said "Beautiful design, clever mechanics that challenge the tactician. If you like war games, then you shouldn't miss out on this gem." PocketgamerUK said "Another slice of exacting, unadorned tactical play from Shenandoah, Drive on Moscow doesn't tinker much with Battle of the Bulge's mechanics, but its new setting makes for an equally worthwhile challenge."

References

2013 video games
Computer wargames
IOS games
IOS-only games
Slitherine Software games
Strategy video games
Video games developed in the United States
Video games set in the Soviet Union
World War II video games

External links 
https://gamers-hq.de/media/pdf/f0/23/31/ZIP-S_DriveonMoscow-v3F.pdf